Tsovinar Vardanyan (born 8 September 1980) is an Armenian economist and politician of the Civil Contract. Since 2018 she is a member of the National Assembly of Armenia.

Early life and education 
Tsovinar Vardanyan was born in 1980 in Yerevan, Soviet Armenia. She studied economy at the Yerevan State University from where she graduated with a BSc in 2001 and an MSc in 2003. While studying for her Masters, she was employed in different positions of the Central Bank of Armenia between 2002 and 2003.

Professional career 
Between 2006 and 2014 she worked in financial institutions and between 2014 and 2019 she was in the executive leadership of several companies in Armenia.

Political career 
She was elected a Member of Parliament in the parliamentary elections of December 2018 for the Civil Contract within the My Step Alliance. In May 2021, she was announced as a candidate for the My Step alliance and was re-elected in the snap parliamentary elections of June 2021.

Political positions 
She was a leading force behind the introduction of paternal leave in Armenia in January 2021.

References 

1980 births
People from Yerevan
Yerevan State University alumni
Living people
21st-century Armenian women politicians
21st-century Armenian politicians
Members of the 7th convocation of the National Assembly (Armenia)